The 1938 Pacific hurricane season ran through the summer and fall of 1938. Before the satellite age started in the 1960s, data on east Pacific hurricanes was extremely unreliable. Most east Pacific storms were of no threat to land. However, 1938 saw an unusually active season, with numerous tropical cyclones forming in January and a hurricane struck Northern California in February, killing five people. On August 18, Cyclone Mokapu caused record August rainfall, and a record low pressure when it struck Hawaiian Islands. It brought down power lines and damages into a plantation.

Systems

Tropical Cyclone One and Two
Two tropical cyclones existed in January, one near the International dateline and another near the Revillagigedo Islands.

Hurricane Three
A hurricane hit Northern California in early to mid-February, killing five.

Possible Tropical Storm Four
A tropical storm possibly existed in the Gulf of Tehuantepec on June 2.

Tropical Cyclone Five
On June 15, a tropical cyclone was observed. It was moving northwestward.

Tropical Cyclone Six
On June 20, a tropical cyclone was observed west of Manzanillo. Two days later, it was observed again south of the entrance to the Gulf of California. The tropical cyclone was not observed after June 22.

Tropical Cyclone Seven
Southeast of Acapulco, a tropical cyclone existed on June 25.

Tropical Cyclone Eight
On July 28, a tropical cyclone caused gales in the Gulf of Tehuantepec.

Tropical Cyclone Nine
A tropical cyclone existed on August 1. It moved west, and was last detected on August 2.

Tropical Cyclone Ten
A tropical storm was detected on August 4. It was moving westwards.

Tropical Depression Eleven
On August 18, a tropical depression formed close to the Revillagigedo Islands. By the next day, it had move to a location west-southwest or west of Cabo San Lucas. The cyclone dissipated by late August 19.

Cyclone Mokapu
On August 18 and 19, a severe storm struck the Hawaiian Islands. The storm also downed power lines and damaged crops and trees at a plantation. The Central Pacific Hurricane Center calls this event the "Mokapu Cyclone" and speculates that it might have been caused by a tropical cyclone.

Possible Tropical Depression Thirteen
On September 1, a possible tropical depression formed south of Cape Corrientes. Without strengthening, it moved into the Gulf of California, from which it made landfall on September 3.

Tropical Cyclone Fourteen
In the Gulf of Tehuantepec, a tropical cyclone formed on September 4. It moved along the coast of Mexico, staying offshore, and dissipated on September 13 while off the west coast of the Baja California.

Tropical Cyclone Fifteen
A short-lived tropical cyclone existed between Salina Cruz and Acapulco on September 11.

Possible Tropical Cyclone Sixteen
On September 24 and 25, a ship encountered stormy weather and gales. These were probably caused by a tropical cyclone located west of the Revillagigedo Islands.

Tropical Cyclone Seventeen
On October 9, a ship encountered a tropical cyclone.

Tropical Cyclone Eighteen
On October 22, a tropical cyclone existed.

See also

1938 Atlantic hurricane season
1938 Pacific typhoon season
1930s North Indian Ocean cyclone seasons
 1900–1940 South Pacific cyclone seasons
 1900–1950 South-West Indian Ocean cyclone seasons
 1930s Australian region cyclone seasons

References

1938 in California
1938 in Hawaii
Pacific hurricane seasons
1930s Pacific hurricane seasons